EF-hand domain-containing protein 1 is a protein that in humans is encoded by the EFHC1 gene.

EFHC1 variants initially thought to be pathogenic in epilepsy were found in unaffected controls of the same ancestry so that this is not a likely epilepsy gene.

References

Further reading

EF-hand-containing proteins